Trial is the eighteenth studio album by Japanese alternative rock band The Pillows. It was released on January 18, 2012.

Track listing

References 

http://www.cdjapan.co.jp/detailview.html?KEY=AVCD-38405
http://www.yesasia.com/us/trial-album-dvd-japan-version/1025685950-0-0-0-en/info.html
 https://archive.today/20130218190652/http://www.pillows.jp/pp/discographys
 http://www.jpopasia.com/group/thepillows/lyrics/trial::13321.html
 http://www.japantimes.co.jp/text/fm20120119l3.html

The Pillows albums
2012 albums